Ganga Ki Lahren is a 1964 Hindi drama film produced and directed by Devi Sharma. The film stars Kishore Kumar, Dharmendra, Savitri, Aruna Irani, Rehman and Asit Sen. The music of the film is by Chitragupt, with lyrics by Majrooh Sultanpuri, featuring songs like "Ganga Ki Lahren".

Cast 
Dharmendra as Ashok
Savitri as Seema
Aruna Irani as Neeta
Kishore Kumar as Kishore
 Nasir Hussain as Diwan Saab(Ashok's father)
Rehman as  Dr. Balraj
 Kumkum as Uma Devi
 Asit Sen as Ram Lakhan
 Tun Tun as  Kishore s  maid
Mridula Rani as Dr Balraj's mother
Hari Shivdasani as Laxmidas(Kishore's father)
Brahm Bharadwaj as Thakur
Master Shahid as Munna
Azra as Ragini(Neeta's elder sister)

Soundtrack 
"Machalti Hui Hava Me Chham Chham" – Kishore Kumar, Lata Mangeshkar
"Chhedo Na Meri Zulfen Sab Log Kyaa Kahenge" – Kishore Kumar ,Lata Mangeshkar
"Jay Jay He Jagdambe Mata" – Lata Mangeshkar
"Shama Bujhane Ko Chalee" – Mohammed Rafi
"Ae Janeman Hans Lo Zara" – Kishore Kumar
"Ek Paise Ka Hai Sawal" – Usha Mangeshkar
"Bairi Bichhua Bada Dukh De" – Lata Mangeshkar
"Dekho Re Koi Kaminiya" – Asha Bhosle

External links 
 

1964 films
1960s Hindi-language films
Films scored by Chitragupta